The Ninja ZX-10 (also called ZX-10 "Tomcat") was a sport motorcycle manufactured by Kawasaki Motorcycles between 1988 and 1990, part of the Kawasaki Ninja line.

Design
The ZX-10 replaced the GPZ1000RX as the flagship sportbike from Kawasaki.

The engine was designed after its predecessor's, with the same displacement but 36 mm semi-downdraft CV carburetors and a narrower valve angle. Engine internals were altered: Compression ratio was raised to 11.0:1; lighter pistons and bigger valves were used.

It had Kawasaki's first aluminum perimeter frame, a design which has since become standard.

Aerodynamics were claimed to be better than the outgoing models.

See also
Kawasaki Ninja ZX-10R, a Ninja sportbike produced starting in 2004

References

External links

 

 
 

ZX-10